The Riandahy Falls is a waterfall in the region of Ihorombe in Madagascar. They are situated on the Zomandao River in the Andringitra Massif near the Andringitra National Park. At a distance of less than 1km from these falls, there are also the Rianbavy Falls

References

Waterfalls of Madagascar
Ihorombe